Sakai is both a Japanese surname and a given name. Notable people with the name include:

Surname
Atsushi Sakai (born 1983), Japanese professional wrestler
Daniel Sakai, Oakland SWAT police officer killed in 2009
Frankie Sakai (1929–1996), Japanese comedian
Gotoku Sakai (born 1991), Japanese football (soccer) player currently playing for Hamburger SV
Hideyuki Sakai (born 1973), professional Go player
Hirofumi Sakai (born 1965), Japanese race walker
Hiroki Sakai (born 1990), Japanese football (soccer) player
Hiroko Sakai (born 1978), Japanese softball player who won the gold medal at the 2008 Summer Olympics
Hiroyuki Sakai (born 1942), Japanese chef, starred in the original Iron Chef
Sakai Hōitsu (1761–1828), Japanese painter of the Rinpa school
Izumi Sakai (1967–2007), J-pop singer, song writer, and lead singer of the group Zard
Kanako Sakai (born 1986), Japanese voice actor
Katsuyuki Sakai (born 1988), Japanese rugby union player
, Japanese basketball player
Keikō Sakai (born December 25), Japanese voice actor who works at 81 Produce
Kenichi Sakai (born 1982), Japanese wrestler known by his ring name Ken45°
Kiyoshi Sakai, anime producer and animator
Kōdai Sakai (born 1986), Japanese voice actor
Kōji Sakai (1885–1973), general in the Imperial Japanese Army during the Second Sino-Japanese War and World War II
Maki Sakai (born 1970), Japanese actress
Manabu Sakai (born 1965), Japanese politician of the Liberal Democratic Party and a member of the House of Representatives in the Diet
Masaaki Sakai (born 1946), Japanese rock musician and television performer 
Sakai Masahisa (died 1570), Japanese samurai of the Sengoku Period
Masato Sakai (born 1973), Japanese actor
Miki Sakai (born 1978), Japanese actress and J-pop idol singer
Mikio Sakai (born 1970), Japanese singer-songwriter
Munehisa Sakai, Japanese director
Natsumi Sakai (born 2001), Japanese swimmer
Nick Sakai, a Japanese-American actor
Noriko Sakai (born 1971), Japanese J-pop star and actress
Richard Sakai (born 1954), Emmy-winning Japanese-American television producer
Ryūichi Sakai (born 1970), better known as Marc Panther, Japanese rapper, singer, and co-producer, and a member of the J-pop groups globe and 245
Saburō Sakai (1916–2000), Japanese fighter ace during World War II
Seth Sakai (1932–2007), Japanese-American actor known for various characters he played on Hawaii Five-O and Magnum P.I.
, Japanese swimmer
, Japanese diver
Shogo Sakai (born 1988), Japanese football player currently playing for Montedio Yamagata
, Japanese mathematician
Stan Sakai (born 1953), Japanese-American comic book creator known for his Usagi Yojimbo series
Sumie Sakai (born 1971), Japanese-American professional wrestler
Sakai Tadaaki (1813–1873), Japanese daimyō of the Edo period, and a prominent Tokugawa shogunate of Japan
Sakai Tadakatsu (1587–1662), Japanese tairō, rōjū, master of Wakasa-Obama Castle, and daimyō of Obama Domain in Wakasa province in the mid-17th century Japan
Sakai Tadakatsu (Shōnai) (1594–1647), Japanese daimyō of the early Edo period in Japan
Sakai Tadakiyo (1624–1681), daimyō in Kōzuke Province, and a high-ranking government advisor and official in the Tokugawa shogunate of Japan 
Sakai Tadamochi (1725–1775), Japanese daimyō of the mid-Edo period in Japan
Sakai Tadatsugu (1527–1596), Japanese military commanders for Tokugawa Ieyasu in the late-Sengoku period, and one of the Four Guardians of the Tokugawa (Tokugawa-Shitennō)
Sakai Tadayo (1572–1636), Japanese daimyō of the Sengoku period, and high ranking government advisor holding the title of Rōjū, and later Tairō
Sakai Tadayuki (1770–1828), Japanese daimyō of the mid to late Edo period who ruled the Obama Domain
, Japanese bobsledder
Takashi Sakai (1887–1946), Japanese lieutenant general of the Imperial Japanese Army during World War II
, Japanese footballer
Tatsuya Sakai (marksman), Japanese sport shooter
, Japanese baseball player
Tomoyuki Sakai (born 1979), Japanese football (soccer) player who played in the J-League and on the Japan national team in 2000
Toshihiko Sakai (1871–1933), Japanese socialist known for cofounding the Common Peoples' Newspaper with Shusui Kotoku
Toshio Sakai (1940–1999), photographer for United Press International who won the Pulitzer Prize for Feature Photography in 1968
Toshio Sakai (Go player) (born 1920), professional Go player in Japan
, Japanese ice hockey player
Yoshinori Sakai (born 1945), the Olympic flame torchbearer who lit the cauldron at the 1964 Summer Olympic Games in Tokyo, and gold and silver medalist at the 1966 Asian Games in Bangkok, Thailand
Yoshio Sakai (born 1910), Japanese field hockey player who competed in the 1932 and 1936 Summer Olympics
, Japanese footballer
, Japanese footballer

Given name
Sakai Tanaka (born 1961), Japanese freelance journalist

See also
Sakai (disambiguation) for other uses of the word

Japanese-language surnames